The European qualification for the 2023 World Men's Handball Championship determined nine European contestants at the final tournament, which joined six already qualified teams: Sweden and Poland, as co-hosts, Denmark, as title holder, and three best ranked teams at 2022 European Men's Handball Championship excluding Sweden, Poland and Denmark.

Format
Qualification campaign was organized into two phases.

In the Phase 1, 16 teams not participating at the 2022 European Championship were split into four groups of four teams; the group winners and runners-up advanced to the second phase.

The Phase 2 was divided into two parts. 

The Phase 2 part 1 comprised eight teams advanced from the first phase, joined by the best ranked team according EHF Men´s National Team Ranking List. Those nine teams faced the nine lowest-ranked teams from the 2022 European Championship which haven't qualified directly for the World Championship. The winners of nine ties (home and away matches) proceeded to the second part.

The Phase 2 part 2 comprised nine winners from the first part which faced the nine highest-ranked teams from the 2022 European Championship which haven't qualified directly for the World Championship. The winners of nine ties (home and away matches) qualified for the 2023 World Men's Handball Championship.

Qualification phase 1
The draw took place on 19 August 2021. Each group can decide if they want to play home-and away matches or play the games at a single venue.

Seeding

All times are UTC+1).

Group 1

Group 2

Group 3

Group 4

Qualification phase 2
The qualification phase 2 draw took place on the final weekend of the EHF EURO 2022 in Budapest.

Part 1
Eight teams advanced from the Phase 1 joined by Switzerland as the best ranked team which hasn't qualified for the 2022 European Men's Handball Championship, played against the nine lowest-ranked teams from 2022 European Men's Handball Championship. Matches were played between 14 and 20 March 2022.

Seeding

Overview

|}

All times are UTC+1.

Matches

Slovenia won 57–49 on aggregate.

Portugal won 66–54 on aggregate.

Austria won 62–57 on aggregate.

Greece won 52–43 on aggregate.

North Macedonia won 52–46 on aggregate.

Israel won 55–49 on aggregate.

Belgium won 57–54 on aggregate.

Part 2
The winners from Part 1 advanced and faced the nine highest-ranked teams from 2022 European Men's Handball Championship (other than the six direct qualifiers as described at the beginning of the article). Matches were played between 11 and 17 April 2022.

Seeding

Overview

|}

Matches
All times are UTC+2.

Croatia won 70–43 on aggregate.

Serbia won 57–51 on aggregate.

Portugal won 65–61 on aggregate.

Iceland won 68–56 on aggregate.

Montenegro won 56–50 on aggregate.

North Macedonia won 51–49 on aggregate.

Hungary won 64–54 on aggregate.

Germany won 67–53 on aggregate.

Notes

References

2021 in handball
2022 in handball
World Handball Championship tournaments
Qualification for handball competitions
Sports events affected by the 2022 Russian invasion of Ukraine